Indira Nagar may refer to several places in India:
 Indira Nagar, Chennai
 Indira Nagar, Lucknow
 Indira Nagar, Srinagar
 Indira Nagar, Mysore
 Indira Nagar, Gangavati
 Indira Nagar (Union Territory Assembly constituency), Pondicherry
 Indiranagar, Bangalore